Predrag Vranicki (21 January 192231 January 2002) was a Marxist Humanist and member of the Praxis school in the 1960s in Yugoslavia.

Life
Vranicki was born in 1922, in Benkovac, Croatia. During World War II he fought with the National Liberation Army against the Fascist occupation of Yugoslavia. He received a diploma in philosophy from the University of Zagreb in 1947 and earned his PhD from the University of Belgrade Faculty of Philosophy in 1951. From 1964 to 1966 he was dean of the Faculty of Philosophy in Zagreb, and rector of the Zagreb University from 1972 to 1976. Vranicki became president of the Yugoslav Society for Philosophy in 1966, and in 1979 he was elected as a full member of the Croatian Academy of Sciences and Arts.

When the dissident Praxis journal was initiated in 1965, he joined its editorial board.

Major works
He was interested in the problems of humanism, history and freedom, and his major works are:
Dialectical and Historical Materialism (1958)
History of Marxism (1961, 3 volumes)
Karl Marx: The Development of His Thought
Marxism and Socialism (1979)
Philosophical Studies (1979)
The Socialist Alternative (1982)
Philosophy of History (1988)

External links
On the Problem of Practice by Predrag Vranicki
The State and the Party in Socialism by Predrag Vranicki (In Croatian)
In memoriam by Ivan KUVAČIĆ in Novi list
Nin, In memoriam (In Serbian)

1922 births
2002 deaths
Marxist theorists
Rectors of the University of Zagreb
Members of the Croatian Academy of Sciences and Arts
University of Belgrade Faculty of Philosophy alumni
People from Benkovac
Yugoslav philosophers
20th-century Croatian philosophers